The Kreisliga, along with the Kreisoberliga and the Kreisklasse, are the lowest set of divisions in the German football league system, set at step 8 and below.

Structure  
Whereas the top amateur divisions are organised by the 21 state football associations of the German Football Association, the bottom divisions fall under the jurisdiction of their subsidiary bodies, being more than 400 district football associations that organise their divisions mostly following the borders of the corresponding policial districts. Therefore, in the league pyramid, the Kreisliga ranks below the superior state association's divisions, typically being the Verbandsliga, the Landesliga and depending on the state association's structure also the Bezirksliga.

The Kreisliga exists within all associations in varying numbers and form. There are usually multiple levels of Kreisliga, distinguished by the suffix A, B, C or D. Some district associations also run a Kreisklasse below then Kreisliga, the Kreisklasse then distinguished by the prefix 1st, 2nd and 3rd. Several associations also run a Kreisoberliga as their top flight above the Kreisliga or Kreisklasse.

Overview by state association

References

External links
All tables and results from the German amateur football leagues

 
9